Kenneth Thomas Wood (15 May 1906 – 11 November 1942) was an Australian rugby league footballer who played in the 1920s and 1930s.  He played for North Sydney in the NSWRL competition.

Background
Wood was born in Petersham, New South Wales on 15 May 1906.

Playing career
Wood made his first grade debut for North Sydney against St George in Round 14 1928 at the Sydney Cricket Ground.  In 1928, Norths finished 4th on the table and qualified for the finals.  Wood scored a try in the club's semi final defeat against Eastern Suburbs.

Wood played representative football for Metropolis against New Zealand in 1930.  Wood played with Norths up until the end of 1934 before retiring.

Post playing
Wood enlisted in the Australian Army in 1940 whilst he was living in Brisbane, Queensland.

Death
Wood served in World War II and fought on battles in the Kokoda Track against the Japanese.  On 11 November 1942, Wood was killed in action and was later buried at the Bomana war cemetery in Port Moresby.

References

North Sydney Bears players
Rugby league players from Sydney
Rugby league centres
City New South Wales rugby league team players
1906 births
1942 deaths
Australian Army personnel of World War II
Australian Army soldiers
Australian military personnel killed in World War II
Burials at Port Moresby (Bomana) War Cemetery